Maria Tore Barbina (July 22, 1940, Udine – August 28, 2007) was an Italian poet and translator. She was a teacher of Latin Literature at the University of Trieste and of Latin Paleography at University of Udine.

Bibliography
Dizionario pratico e illustrato Italiano-Friulano (Agraf, Udine 1980) / Practical and Illustrated Italian-Friulan Dictionary /
Saggio sulle scrittrici in lingua italiana (Rebellato, Torre di Mosto 1984) /Essay on female writers in Italian language /
La condizione femminile da documenti friulani dell'età dei castelli (Udine 1988) / Female condition from Friulan document from the age of the castles /
Vocabolario della lingua friulana Italiano-Friulano (Verbi editore, Udine 1991) / Vocabulary of Friulan language Italian-Friulan /
Diplomi del monastero benedettino di S. Maria di Aquileia (Biblioteca Comunale di Verona, ms. 707)" (Gruppo Archeologico Aquileiese 2000)

Poems
Oltre il silenzio (afterword by Maria Grazia Lenisa) (DARS, Udine 2001)
D'amore e d'altro poco (afterword by Maria Grazia Lenisa) (Bastogi, Foggia 2002)
Furlanis (preface by Gianfranco D'Aronco) (Campanotto Editore, Udine 2004)
Cjantant l'amôr in rimis - Madrigai (afterword by Maria Grazia Lenisa) (Campanotto Editore, Udine 2007)

Friulian translations 
Aristophanes "Lisistrate" (La Nuova Base, Udine 1985)
Gaspara Stampa "Rimis di Amôr" (La Nuova Base, Udine 1985)
Emily Dickinson "Poesiis" (La Nuova Base, Udine 1986)

External links
 Info

1940 births
2007 deaths
People from Udine
Translators to Friulian
Friulian-language writers
Italian-language writers
20th-century Italian poets
20th-century Italian women writers
20th-century Italian translators
Italian women poets